is a public women's junior college in Fukuyama, Hiroshima, Japan, established in 1963.

In August 2010 the college announced that it stopped admitting students in preparation for Fukuyama City University (established in April 2011).

References

External links
 Official website 

Educational institutions established in 1963
Public universities in Japan
Universities and colleges in Hiroshima Prefecture
Japanese junior colleges
1963 establishments in Japan